The United Party was a political party in Zambia.

History
The party was established in mid-1966 by two Lozi-speaking MPs, one from the United National Independence Party (Dickson Chikulo) and one from the Zambian African National Congress (Mufaya Mumbuna). It was originally named the United Front before becoming the United Party. The founders were later joined by other prominent political figures, including former minister Nalumino Mundia, who became its president. The defections resulted in by-elections being called, with only Chikulo standing for re-election (and losing).

The party grew rapidly, but was banned in August 1968 after the government blamed it for violence. It subsequently merged into the ZANC.

References

Defunct political parties in Zambia
1966 establishments in Zambia
Political parties established in 1966
1968 disestablishments in Zambia
Political parties disestablished in 1968